Sickle Moon Peak or Bharanzar Peak is located in the Kishtwar Himalaya and is the highest summit of the range.

The Brammah massif lies south of Sickle Moon and is separated by a 12 kilometer glacier. The nearest Peaks are Brahma I , Flat Top , Brahma II , and Arjuna , listed in order from west to east.

Mountaineering
The east Kishtwar range of Brahma massif was first assessed by an Australian team in 1939. The eastern approaches of this Peak were explored by Fritz Kolb and his friends, the two Austrian mountaineers in 1947, from its base at Machail and climbed two small peeks. After a period of closure, the area was again open to foreigners in the early seventies, and there was a rush to climb the obvious plums in the western region. In 1973 British mountaineers Nick Escourt and Chris Bonington  made an ascent of Brammah I (6416 m) and two years later in 1975 a team of  Indian High Altitude Warfare School (HAWS) led by Lt. Col. D. N. Tankha made the first ascent of this Peak.

The massif is accessed by 145 kilometers by road from  Srinagar up to Kishtwar town and then 50  kilometers alpine track leads to the base of the summit.

References

Climbing areas of India
Mountains of Jammu and Kashmir
Kishtwar district
Six-thousanders of the Himalayas